This is a list of European men's national football team managers. This encompasses every manager who currently manages a men's national team under the control of UEFA.

Managers
Last update: 14 March 2023. Default sorting is descending by time as manager.

See also
List of African national football team managers
List of European women's national football team managers
List of Oceanian national football team managers
List of Asian national football team managers
List of South American national football team managers
List of North American national soccer team managers

References